The 2016 Swedish Golf Tour, known as the Nordea Tour for sponsorship reasons, was the 31st season of the Swedish Golf Tour, a series of professional golf tournaments for women held in Sweden and Norway.

A number of the tournaments also featured on the 2016 LET Access Series (LETAS).

Schedule
The season consisted of 9 tournaments played between May and October, where two events were held in Norway.

See also
2016 Swedish Golf Tour (men's tour)

References

External links
Official homepage of the Swedish Golf Tour

Swedish Golf Tour (women)
Swedish Golf Tour (women)